George S. Tavlas is an economist. He has been the Alternate to the Governor of the Bank of Greece for the European Central Bank since 2008. Tavlas was Director General of the Bank of Greece from 2010-2013, and a member of the General Council and the Monetary Policy Council of the Bank of Greece from 2013 to 2020. He was involved in the management and resolution of the Greek government-debt crisis. Tavlas is Editor-in-Chief of Open Economies Review (published by Springer). He is also a Distinguished Visiting Fellow at the Hoover Institution at Stanford University.

Life and work 
Tavlas was born in Worcester, Massachusetts to parents who immigrated to the United States from Greece. He earned his B.A. from Babson College and his M.A. from New York University (NYU). He then earned his Ph.D. from NYU in 1977 after completing his dissertation titled: Essays on the Doctrinal Development of Milton Friedman’s Monetary Economics.

Tavlas started his career as an economist in the U.S. Department of State. He was an advisor for the World Bank and the Organization of Economic Cooperation and Development. Before joining the Bank of Greece, he was a Division Chief at the International Monetary Fund.

In addition to his roles at the Bank of Greece, from 2016 to 2019, Tavlas formed a part of the Supervisory Board of the Hellenic Corporation for Assets and Participations (HCAP), the sovereign wealth fund of the Greek state. During his tenure, he assisted in the creation and implementation of the policies responsible for the privatization of state-held assets in Greece as well as the supervision of the portfolio of state-held assets in Greece.

Academia 
He is an active researcher in the areas of monetary policy, monetary doctrine, and time-series econometrics, with numerous academic publications. His book, The Monetarists: The Making of the Chicago Monetary Tradition, 1927 to 1960, will be published by the University of Chicago Press in March 2023.

Tavlas is also a Distinguished Visiting Fellow at the Hoover Institution at Stanford University. He was a Visiting Professor at Leicester University and a Visiting Scholar at the Brookings Institution, the Becker Friedman Institute at the University of Chicago, the South African Reserve Bank, the Lebow School of Business at Drexel University, and Duke University’s Center for the History of Political Economy.

Selected publications 

 Tavlas, George S. (November 1993) "The ‘new’ theory of optimum currency areas." World Economy 16, no. 6 (1993): 663-685. https://doi.org/10.1111/j.1467-9701.1993.tb00189.x
 Bailey, Martin J., George S. Tavlas, and Michael Ulan. (Spring 1987)  "The impact of exchange-rate volatility on export growth: some theoretical considerations and empirical results." Journal of Policy Modeling 9, no. 1 (1987): 225-243. https://doi.org/10.1016/0161-8938(87)90010-X
 Tavlas, George S. (March 1994) "The theory of monetary integration." Open economies review 5, no. 2 (1994): 211-230. https://doi.org/10.1007/BF01000489
 Gibson, Heather D., Stephen G. Hall, and George S. Tavlas. (April 2012) "The Greek financial crisis: Growing imbalances and sovereign spreads." Journal of International Money and Finance 31, no. 3 (2012): 498-516. https://doi.org/10.1016/j.jimonfin.2011.10.009
 Dellas, Harris, and George S. Tavlas. (November 2009) "An optimum-currency-area odyssey." Journal of International Money and Finance 28, no. 7 (2009): 1117-1137. https://doi.org/10.1016/j.jimonfin.2009.06.001
 Tavlas, George S. (January 1990) "On the international use of currencies: the case of the Deutsche Mark." (1990). Tavlas, George, On the International Use of Currencies: The Case of the Deutsche Mark (January 1990). IMF Working Paper No. 90/3, Available at SSRN: https://ssrn.com/abstract=884520
 Gibson, Heather D., Theodore Palivos, and George S. Tavlas (March 2014). "The crisis in the euro area: An analytic overview." Journal of Macroeconomics 39 (2014): 233-239. https://doi.org/10.1016/j.jmacro.2013.09.014
 Kelejian, Harry H., George S. Tavlas, and George Hondroyiannis. (December 2006) "A spatial modeling approach to contagion among emerging economies." Open economies review 17, no. 4 (2006): 423-441. https://doi.org/10.1007/s11079-006-0357-7
 Swamy, Paravastu AVB, and George S. Tavlas. (June 1995) "Random coefficient models: Theory and applications." Journal of Economic Surveys 9, no. 2 (1995): 165-196.  https://doi.org/10.1111/j.1467-6419.1995.tb00113.x
 Gibson, Heather D., Stephen G. Hall, and George S. Tavlas. "The effectiveness of the ECB's asset purchase programs of 2009 to 2012." Journal of Macroeconomics 47 (2016): 45-57.https://doi.org/10.1016/j.jmacro.2015.09.00

References 

American economists
Greek economists
New York University alumni
Babson College alumni
Historians of economic thought
People from Worcester, Massachusetts
Year of birth missing (living people)
Living people